Andrea Franchi (1335 - 26 May 1401) was an Italian Roman Catholic member of the Order of Preachers who served as the Bishop of Pistoia before his resignation due to ill health. Franchi became a noted preacher and evangelist who was also known for his holiness and his deep commitment to the poor of his diocese.

The confirmation of the late bishop's 'cultus' (or popular devotion) allowed for Pope Benedict XV to confirm Franchi's beatification on 21 November 1921.

Life
Andrea Franchi was born in Pistoia in 1335 as the third of four children that included Francesco di Franco di Simone Franchi as well as Bartolomeo - an advisor of Pope Urban VI and Pope Boniface IX - and the Luca (who joined Franchi in the order).

Franchi studied at the Dominican convent of Santa Maria Novella in Pistoia and joined the Dominicans at the age of fourteen in 1359. He was later ordained to the priesthood and became a noted preacher and evangelist. He also served as a teacher in Rome of both philosophical and theological studies. Franchi served from 1369 until 1381 as the prior of the Dominican houses in his home of Pistoia as well as Lucca and Orvieto.

Franchi became the Bishop of Pistoia in 1382 after Pope Urban VI appointed him to that position; the new bishop received his episcopal consecration sometime in 1382. He administered to the poor and to the ill and gained the moniker of the "Father of the Poor". But ill health forced him to - on 29 May 1400 - relinquish his episcopal see and he returned to his Pistoia convent where he remained for the final months of his life.

Franchi died in 1401. He was interred in the church of San Domenico in Pistoia and his remains were deemed to be incorrupt after their exhumation in 1613 - a sweet odor was said to have emanated from his remains following the exhumation.

Beatification
Franchi received formal beatification from Pope Benedict XV on 21 November 1921 after the pontiff confirmed the late bishop's 'cultus' (or popular devotion and following).

References

External links
Saints SQPN
Catholic Hierarchy

1335 births
1401 deaths
14th-century venerated Christians
14th-century Italian Roman Catholic priests
Beatifications by Pope Benedict XV
Bishops in Tuscany
Dominican bishops
Dominican beatified people
Italian beatified people
Members of the Dominican Order
People from Pistoia
Venerated Dominicans
Venerated Catholics